Daniel Stewart McLeod (14 June 1861 – 20 June 1958) was  a Scottish catch wrestler of the late nineteenth and early twentieth century, who held the American Heavyweight Championship twice.  He worked as a miner in Nanaimo, British Columbia and wrestled his first match in 1889, winning the Pacific Coast heavyweight championship that same year.

On 26 October 1897, McLeod defeated Martin Burns to win the American Heavyweight Championship, which he would retain for four years. The most notable incident during his reign as champion came far away from the media spotlight when on 18 June 1899, McLeod met and defeated a young Frank Gotch in a hard-fought impromptu match on a cinder track. It was Gotch's very first professional match and he later recounted that McLeod had hustled all involved by pretending to be a simple furniture dealer from a neighboring town, but was sufficiently impressed by Gotch's talent to leave him a visiting card revealing his true identity.  Gotch would go on to defeat McLeod on multiple occasions after much training under Martin "Farmer" Burns.  McLeod occasionally used the "catch name" alias George Little.

McLeod's reign as champion came to an end on 7 November 1901, when he was defeated by Tom Jenkins. Amid a series of rematches between the two men, McLeod recaptured the title on Christmas Day 1902 but lost it to Jenkins the following April at Broadway Arsenal.

After retirement, McLeod worked as a wrestling instructor at the Los Angeles Athletic Club.

See also
 List of oldest surviving professional wrestlers

Championships and accomplishments
 Catch wrestling
 World Catch-as-Catch-Can Championship (1 time)
 American Catch-as-Catch-can Championship (1 time)
Professional Wrestling
American Heavyweight Championship (2 times)

References

1861 births
1958 deaths
19th-century professional wrestlers
20th-century professional wrestlers
British catch wrestlers
People associated with physical culture
Scottish male professional wrestlers
Scottish expatriate sportspeople in the United States
Scottish expatriates in Canada
Scottish miners